Henri Emmanuel Blanc-Fontaine (16 January 1819, Grenoble - 20 December 1897, Sassenage) was a French painter. He created genre scenes, portraits, landscapes, and still lifes.

Biography
He had originally planned to have a legal career, but followed the advice of his friend, Diodore Rahoult, a rising local artist, and went to Paris, where he was a pupil of Léon Cogniet. In 1843, he also enrolled at the École de Beaux-Arts. He had his first exhibit at the Salon in 1848. Rahoult introduced him to landscape painting in 1853, and that became his favorite subject after 1870.

He was also a pupil of Jean Achard (whose portrait he painted; now kept in the Museum of Grenoble) and François-Auguste Ravier in Charlieu. The painter, Eugénie Gruyer-Brielman, was his sister-in-law, by her relationship to his wife, Julie Amélie, née Gruyer.

In 1868, he and Rahoult were commissioned to decorate the new . His paintings can be seen at the Museum of Grenoble, the Musée dauphinois and the Musée des Beaux-Arts de Chambéry. His painting Souvenir de La Grave won an honorable mention at the 1855 Exposition Universelle in Paris, and was noticed by Maxime Du Camp.

Sources 
 Nathalie Servonnat-Favier, catalogue of the exhibition Peintre(s) à Proveysieux, Musée de l'Ancien Évêché, Grenoble, 2003
 Dictionnaire des petits Maîtres de la Peinture (1820-1920), Pierre Cabanne and Gerald Schurr, Amateur editions, 2003,

External links

  Works by Henri Blanc-Fontaine, on Culture.gouv.fr

1819 births
1897 deaths
Artists from Grenoble
19th-century French painters
French male painters
French genre painters
19th-century French male artists